Sanjeli, (Hindi: संजेली)cotila or sometimes known as Sanjeda Mehvassi, is a Hindu former petty princely state, located in the present Gujarat state in western India.

It is now also one of the tehsils of Dahod district.

History
It became a British protectorate in 1820. During the period 1820 to 1937, the territory of the state remained stable at 88 square kilometers of beautiful undulating land inhabited mainly by simple, good tribal people. In 1892, the state had a population of 3,751.

It became a third class state in Rewa Kantha Agency's Rewa Kantha division (until its 1937 merger with Baroda State into Baroda and Gujarat States Agency). The Maharaja enjoyed a privy purse of 40,000 rupees. 
In 1901 - 1914 it was under direct British India administration due to minority rule.

On 10 June 1948, it ceased to exist by accession to the Bombay State at India's independence.

Ruling chiefs
Rulers held the title of Thakur.

 1750 - 1789 (No. 38) Sardarsinhji              
 1789 - 1814 (No. 39) Bahadursinhji
 1814 - 1857 (No. 40) Jagatsinhji               
 1858 - 1901 (No. 41) Pratapsinhji                
 1902 - 1941 (No. 42) Pushpsinhji
 1941 - 1948 (No. 43) Narendrasinhji

References 

Princely states of Gujarat